Cronin Peak is a high mountain summit in the southern Sawatch Range of the Rocky Mountains of North America. Cronin Peak was named in honor of Mary Cronin, who in 1934 become the first woman to climb all 53 Colorado fourteeners.

Mountain

See also

List of Colorado mountain ranges
List of Colorado mountain summits
List of Colorado fourteeners
List of Colorado 4000 meter prominent summits
List of the most prominent summits of Colorado
List of Colorado county high points

References

External links

Mountains of Colorado
Mountains of Chaffee County, Colorado
San Isabel National Forest
North American 4000 m summits